Bliss is a 1997 American erotic drama film written and directed by Lance Young, in his film debut. It stars Sheryl Lee, Craig Sheffer, and Terence Stamp. The film also features appearances by Lance Young's sister, Leigh Taylor-Young, as well as Molly Parker. The story revolves around a young married couple who are trying to address issues impacting their sex life. The film is also a surreptitious analysis on the teachings of tantric sex.

Media attention on the film was limited yet the reception was divided among the critics. It was screened during the opening of the San Francisco International Film Festival.

Plot synopsis 
Maria (Sheryl Lee) and Joseph (Craig Sheffer) are a young couple, married for only six months, but already facing issues that prevent them from enjoying a fulfilling sex life. In their attempt to address and resolve the issue, they reach out to marriage counsellor Alfred (Spalding Gray). During the process, Joseph is shocked to find out that Maria has never had a genuine orgasm when they had sex with each other. Meanwhile, Maria, who is not happy with the results of Alfred's traditional psychoanalytic approach, reaches out to Baltazar (Terence Stamp).

Joseph works as an architect at a construction site. One day, while at work, Joseph's site colleagues invite him to spy on an old man who is having sex with The Redhead. It is only when he decides to look through the telescope lens that he finds out that one of the women is Maria. The old man is Baltazar, an alternative sex therapist who engages in sex with his patients as part of his technique. Joseph, furious, confronts Balthazar about him and his wife, but in a turn of events he becomes a patient himself. During one of his attempts to practice the techniques taught by Baltazar, Joseph causes Maria to suffer a seizure, which results in her hospitalization. At that time it is revealed that her sex life dysfunction is linked to the sexual abuse that she suffered as a child, perpetrated by her father. She is now called to confront the memories of her past in order to recover.

Cast 
 Sheryl Lee as Maria
 Craig Sheffer as Joseph
 Terence Stamp as Baltazar
 Casey Siemaszko as Tanner
 Spalding Gray as Alfred
 Leigh Taylor-Young as Redhead
 Lois Chiles as Eva
 Blu Mankuma as Nick
 Ken Camroux as Hank
 Pamela Perry as Dottie
 Eli Gabay as Carlos
 Molly Parker as Connie

Production

Casting 
Sheryl Lee researched psychology and attended a tantric sex workshop, in preparation for the role of Maria. Craig Sheffer was  hired to be the main character in this movie after Leigh Taylor-Young recommended him to her brother Lance Young. Both Leigh and Craig worked together in the TV series, The Hamptons; Leigh played Craig Sheffer's mom in the five-episode series.

Soundtrack 
The score for the film was written by Polish composer Jan A. P. Kaczmarek (winner of the 2005 Academy Award for Best Original Score  for Finding Neverland). The soundtrack is furnished with classical orchestra cues, primarily accompanied by piano or violin, and occasionally features a soprano.

Release

Critical response 
The film received mixed reviews by the critics in both mainstream media as well as smaller publications. Sheffer and Lee's performances were harshly criticized by The New York Times critic, Stephen Holden, who mentioned that "If the cast deserves at least half a gold star for pretending to take this stuff seriously, neither Mr. Sheffer nor Ms. Lee are able to make their yuppie characters likable".

Richard von Busack was of similar opinion regarding Lee's acting, noting that "Almost useless as either erotica or therapy, Bliss squanders Lee. As good as she is as a vengeful girl, she's still awfully soppy as a weeper." At the same time both Lee and Sheffer were praised as extraordinarily layered, powerful, physical and fearless, by Jeffrey M. Anderson of Combustible Celluloid.

Terence Stamp was unanimously considered to be predictably good and well-suited in the run-of-the-mill role of the therapist. Moving away from the quality of the acting itself, Kevin Thomas of Los Angeles Times believed the film fails--primarily due to Young's writing and direction. One of his major criticisms was that information about Maria's character is mentioned by the other leading characters instead of the viewer discovering it through the film's plot. Another point Thomas raises is the fact that there is considerable imbalance on the level of graphic depiction of sex scenes based on gender participation. Even though the film has extensive sex scenes involving a female character (Maria) and a male character (Joseph), he points out that it becomes conservative when it comes to equivalent scenes between two male characters (Joseph and Baltazar).

What the critics agreed on, across the board, is that the film has a plethora of erotic scenes. So much so that it can be mistaken for educational or academic manual about sex. Despite the varying opinions on the quality of the film overall, it was generally acknowledged by the critics that the topic addressed in the film is very important.

Box office 
The film screened on the weekend of June 6–8 in the United States, making $54,547 in that first weekend of its release. Ultimately, it grossed $294,064.

Controversy 
Significant controversy arose regarding the film's rating, due to the extensive erotic scenes and strong sex related dialogue as well as the rather novel (at the time) topic it negotiates. As a result, it was initially assigned an NC-17 rating by the Motion Picture Association of America which was strongly contested by Young. After a lengthy process of numerous re-submissions to the MPAA and arguing his case in front of a special appeals board, the film was eventually released with an R rating in the American theaters. The final version of the film suffered several scene omissions and script edits.

References

External links 
 
 

1997 films
1990s English-language films
American erotic drama films
Triumph Films films
Films shot in Vancouver
Films scored by Jan A. P. Kaczmarek
1990s erotic drama films
1997 directorial debut films
1997 drama films
1990s American films